Sakis Papavasiliou (born 21 August 1976) is a Greek professional football manager and former player.

References

1976 births
Living people
Greek footballers
Pierikos F.C. players
Panionios F.C. players
Niki Volos F.C. players
Athlitiki Enosi Larissa F.C. players
Panargiakos F.C. players
Agrotikos Asteras F.C. players
Pyrsos Grevena F.C. players
Aetos Skydra F.C. players
Pyrgetos F.C. players
Super League Greece players
Greek football managers
Aiginiakos F.C. managers
A.E. Karaiskakis F.C. managers
AO Chania F.C. managers
Olympiacos Volos F.C. managers
Kavala F.C. managers
GAS Ialysos 1948 F.C. managers
Kozani F.C. managers
Association football midfielders
Footballers from Katerini